Haydenshapes Surfboards is an Australian performance surfboard brand founded by Hayden Cox in 1996. Haydenshapes' most notable design is the Hypto Krypto model, and the brand is known for their use of parabolic carbon fibre frame surfboard technology FutureFlex. The Haydenshapes core team of professional athletes include influential free surfer Craig Anderson (Quiksilver) and surfer Creed Mctaggart (Billabong).

History

Haydenshapes Surfboards was founded in 1996 by Hayden Cox in Sydney, Australia. Hayden was 15 and in high school at the time. After snapping his favourite surfboard and not having the money available to purchase a new one, he decided to make one instead. In 2006, Haydenshapes launched the newly invented and patented FutureFlex (formally known as FiberFlex, created by Hayden Cox) a parabolic carbon fibre frame technology, a modern take on the traditional "wooden stringer" surfboard design. In 2011, Haydenshapes signed a global distribution deal that launched the brand globally into 70 countries. In 2013, Haydenshapes opened a US manufacturing facility and office in El Segundo, California. Haydenshapes currently manufacture surfboards in Australia, USA and Thailand.

Awards
Haydenshapes Surfboards were awarded Surfboard of the Year two years in a row (2014 and 2015) for their Hypto Krypto surfboard design. 

Haydenshapes also received praise for style and innovation in the 'Sports and Leisure' category at the Australian Good Design Awards in 2014.

Other awards include news.com.au Entrepreneur of the Year in 2011 and winner of ABC Television's The New Inventors series (episode 26).

References

External links

Sporting goods manufacturers of Australia
Clothing brands of Australia
Surfwear brands
Manufacturing companies established in 1996
Retail companies of Australia
Privately held companies of Australia
Surfing in Australia
Multinational companies headquartered in Australia
Australian companies established in 1996
Manufacturing companies based in Sydney